Jye McNeil (born 1994) is an Australian jockey based in Victoria. His race victories include the 2020 Melbourne Cup.

McNeil began his career in 2011. As of mid-October 2021, he has ridden 789 winners, including four in Group One races.

McNeil's first Group One victory was on Kings Will Dream in the 2019 Turnbull Stakes. He won the 2020 Melbourne Cup on Twilight Payment after leading throughout the race.

He and his wife, fellow jockey Jessica Payne, have a son, born in 2020.

Group One wins (4)

Toorak Handicap - I'm Thunderstruck (2021)
Australian Cup - Homesman (2021)
Melbourne Cup - Twilight Payment (2020)
Turnbull Stakes - Kings Will Dream (2019)

References

1994 births
Living people
Australian jockeys